The Smith & Wesson Model 29 is a six-shot, double-action revolver chambered for the .44 Magnum cartridge and manufactured by the United States company Smith & Wesson.

The Model 29 was offered with  barrels as standard models. Other barrel lengths were available either by special order from Smith & Wesson's Custom Shop or custom built by gunsmiths. The  barreled variant had a full length underlug. Finish options available included a highly polished blued or nickel-plated surface.

At the time of its introduction, the Model 29 was the most powerful production handgun, although it was later overtaken by handguns chambered for the even larger .454 Casull and .50 Action Express cartridges. It was made famous worldwide by association with the fictional character "Dirty Harry" Callahan.

Design 
The Model 29 will chamber and fire .44 Special and .44 Russian cartridges, as the .44 Magnum was developed from the .44 Special and the .44 Special was developed from the .44 Russian. The Magnum case is slightly longer to prevent magnum rounds from being chambered and fired in handguns chambered for the .44 Special.

History 
Elmer Keith's achievements in maximizing the power and performance of the .44 Special was the inspiration and driving force behind the introduction of the .44 Magnum by Smith & Wesson. His intention for the new round was for it to be used in sidearms for hunters of large, dangerous game, rather than for self-defense, though with today's specialty cartridges, it can  be a good defensive round.

S&W's production of a large N-frame revolver in .44 Magnum began in 1955; the Model 29 designation was applied in 1957.

At the time of its introduction, the Model 29 was the most powerful production handgun. There were a number of custom calibers that were more powerful, as in the old Howdah pistols of the 19th century.

It remained primarily the province of some handgun enthusiasts, law enforcement personnel, and hunters until 1971, when Clint Eastwood made it famous as "the most powerful handgun in the world" in the movie Dirty Harry. After the release of the movie and its sequels, retailers had difficulty keeping the Model 29 in stock.

In the late 1990s, Smith & Wesson discontinued production of many models of revolvers, including the "basic" Model 29; since then, at various times, the model, in limited or "custom" configurations, has been manufactured in as many as 10 evolutions.

Variants 
The original Model 29 was superseded by the Model 29-1 in 1960, with modifications made to the ejector-rod screw. The Model 29-2 replaced it the following year, with one screw that had secured the cylinder-stop spring being deleted. These two versions are known as "pinned and recessed". "Pinned" means that the barrels are screwed in, and secured by a pin driven through the frame and a notch in the barrel. "Recessed" denotes the rear of the bored cylinder holes being countersunk, so that, when loaded, the cartridge rims are fully enclosed by the cylinder. In 1982, the cost-cutting Model 29-3 dropped recessed cylinders and pinned barrels for crush-fit barrels.

The -4 and -5, produced from 1988 and 1990 respectively had changes to improve durability for heavy use. In 1994 the 29-6 began production, now fitted as standard with rubber Monogrips from Hogue to replace the previous wooden items, standard tapped holes also being provided for attaching scope mounts. The 29-7 started production in 1998 with changes to the locking mechanism, the firing pin's attachment, and a hammer and trigger produced with a metal injection molding process.

Model 629 
Introduced in 1978, the Smith & Wesson Model 629 is a stainless steel version of the Model 29.

The 629 model designation derives from Smith & Wesson's practice of denoting a stainless steel version of one of their already existing designs by placing a 6 in front of the model number of the original weapon.  The 629 Classic variant features a full-length barrel underlug, other variants include the 629 Stealth Hunter.

Quiet Special Purpose Revolver 
Some S&W model 29s were rebuilt by the AAI Corporation to make the Quiet Special Purpose Revolvers (QSPR).

This pistol was developed from 1967 to 1972 to be used by tunnel rats in the Vietnam War. The QSPR was tested on the battlefield in 1969, and an improvement and testing program ran from 1969 to 1972.  It officially never entered service. The US withdrawal from Vietnam reduced interest in the QSPR weapon, and the program ended in 1972 although unsubstantiated rumors claim the QSPR may have been used by CIA assassins during the Cold War, and continues to be used by so-called "Black Book teams".

A Russian handgun introduced in 2002, the OTs-38 Stechkin silent revolver, is described as using a system virtually identical to the QSPR.

Mountain Gun Variation 
The Mountain Gun was introduced in 1989 as a lightweight version of the Model 29 designed to  be "carried often and shot little". The barrel profile is a reprise of the original design. Early version 29-4 backpacker with 2.5" barrel (very rare).

A Smith & Wesson Model 629 with a 3" barrel called the "Trail Boss" was produced for the distributor, RSR.

Other variants 
 On January 26, 2006, Smith & Wesson announced the 50th Anniversary Model 29. Identical to the previous models except for the gold inlaid trademark on the side cover, the new internal lock mechanism, and a non-fluted cylinder.
 On January 1, 2007, Smith & Wesson announced the reissue of the Model 29 as an engraved model in S&W's Classics line.
The entire revolver is made of a stainless steel, with a glare-reducing matte black finish. It comes with slip-resistant synthetic grips.
 The 329NG is a scandium-framed revolver with PVD-coated cylinder and tritium sights. It is part of the NightGuard line.

Gallery

See also 
 Astra Model 44
 Llama Super Comanche
 Table of handgun and rifle cartridges

References

External links 

 Smith & Wesson's .44 Magnum by John Taffin
 Manual

.44 Magnum firearms
Police weapons
Smith & Wesson revolvers
Weapons and ammunition introduced in 1955